Kevin-Okyere Weidlich (born 4 October 1989) is a German-Ghanaian footballer who plays as a midfielder for Teutonia Ottensen.

References

External links
 

1989 births
Living people
Footballers from Hamburg
German footballers
Ghanaian footballers
German sportspeople of Ghanaian descent
Association football midfielders
3. Liga players
Regionalliga players
Altonaer FC von 1893 players
VfL 93 Hamburg players
USC Paloma players
FC St. Pauli II players
TSG Neustrelitz players
Berliner FC Dynamo players
FC Energie Cottbus players
SC Fortuna Köln players
FC Teutonia Ottensen players